"Movin' On" is a song by American singer Mya and it served as the second single from her self-titled debut studio album. It was written and composed by Harrison, Mark Andrews and Darryl Pearson.  Musically, the album version  is a Funk and pop song, while the single remix version is a hip hop song. Lyrically the record speaks of a woman leaving her cheating ex-boyfriend.

Upon its release, the song received generally positive reviews from contemporary music critics, who praised the singles' remix stellar production and Silkk's rap cameo. "Movin' On" became a top 40 hit on Billboards Hot 100; peaking and spending three non-consecutive weeks at number thirty-four. It fared better on the US Hot R&B Singles chart, peaking at number four. Internationally, the single reached the Top 20 in New Zealand.

Its accompanying music video was filmed by director G. Thomas Ferguson and University Music CEO Haqq Islam. The video was shot in the non-fictional high school University High. In the video, Harrison displays her cheerleading skills and towards the end of the video leaves her cheating ex-boyfriend.

Critical reception
Billboard magazine gave the song a positive review, writing, "This is no one-hit wonder. The ingenue who recently scored a pop smash with It's All About Me hits even harder with this wildly contagious, funk-fortified jeep jam. For such a young woman (she's a mere 18), she oozes with the confidence and stylistic flair of an artist twice her age. In an effort to attract the widest range of format support, the label has assembled a stellar remix package that includes Ralphi Rosario's swirling, pop-ready disco-house revision, as well as A. Hagg Islam's raw hip-hop version, which features an impressive rap cameo by Silkk The Shocker."

Accolades

Chart performance
In the United States, "Movin' On" debuted at number 75 on Billboard Hot 100 chart for the issue dated week of August 8, 1998. It ascended from 63-49 in its fourth week for the issue dated week of August 29, 1998. It continued to climb the Hot 100, ascending from 49 to 42 in its fifth week for the issue dated week of September 5, 1998. The song reached its peak at number 34, issue dated week of September 12, 1998. It spent 20 consecutive weeks on the chart. "Movin' On" became Harrison's second consecutive Top 40 (solo) on that chart. It performed better on the Hot R&B Singles chart. It made its debut at number 20, issue dated week of August 1, 1998. It entered the Top Ten issue dated week of August 29, 1998 ascending from 13-7. Due to the strength of the song, if Interscope had released "Movin' On" on cassette and CD configurations; the song could've been a strong contender for number one position. However, despite being available on 12' inch only, the song still managed to rise from 7 to 5 on the Hot R&B Singles chart. The song's move resulted in the chart's highest-ranking 12'-inch only single since MC Hammer's "U Can't Touch This" hit number one on vinyl in 1990. Nevertheless, "Movin' On" reached its peak at number four, issue dated week of September 12, 1998. In total, the song spent 22 consecutive weeks on the chart. It became Harrison's second consecutive Top Ten (solo), and third overall on that chart.

In New Zealand, "Movin' On" debuted at number 32 during the week of March 3, 1999. It reached its peak at number eleven during the week of April 11, 1999. It spent a total of eight non-consecutive weeks on the chart. Harrison earned her third consecutive Top 20 hit in New Zealand.

Legacy
Complex recognized "Movin' On" as one of the Best R&B Videos of the 90's. The song ranked tenth on Billboards list of 20 Best High School Music Videos of All Time. Power star and recording artist Rotimi sampled "Movin' On" for his five-track Summer Bangerz EP (2016).

Remix
A remixed version of "Movin' On" was produced in the process, aptly titled "Movin' Out". It was released as the lead single from the motion picture film Belly (1999) and featured East coast rappers Noreaga and Raekwon. Interscope commissioned a music video which was directed by music director Hype Williams.

Formats and track listings

US 12" single and vinyl single 
A1 "Movin' On" (With Rap) Featuring Silkk the Shocker – 4:30
A2 "Movin' On" (Acapella With Rap) Featuring Silkk the Shocker – 3:58
B1 "Movin' On" (No Rap) – 4:29
B2 "Movin' On" (Instrumental Version) – 4:29

US 12" single and vinyl single 
A1 "Movin' On" (Ralphi's Vox Club) – 7:29
A2 "Movin' On" (Ralphi's Dub) –  7:00
B1 "Movin' On" (Fernando's Club Mix)  –  4:56
B2 "Movin' On" (Fernando's Radio Edit) –  3:53
B3 "Movin' On" (Ralphi's Dub Beats)

US CD single 
 "Movin' On" (Ralphi's Club Edit)  –  3:25
 "Movin' On" (Fernando's Radio Edit)  –  3:52
 "Movin' On" (Featuring Silkk The Shocker) (Clean)  –  4:30
 "Movin' On" (Album Version) – 4:29  

Italy 12" single 
A1 "Movin' On" (Ralphi's Vox Club) – 7:29
A2 "Movin' On" (Ralphi's Dub) – 7:00
B1 "Movin' On" (University Mix Dirty Version) – 5:09
B2 "Movin' On" (Featuring Silkk The Shocker Clean) – 4:30
B3 "Movin' On" (Fernando's Club Mix)

UK 12" single 
A1 "Movin' On" (Ralphi's Vox Club) – 7:29
A2 "Movin' On" (Ralphi's Dub) – 7:00
B1 "Movin' On" (Fernando's Club Mix)  – 4:56
B2 "Movin' On" (Fernando's Radio Edit) – 3:53

European CD single 
 "Movin' On" (Radio Edit) Featuring Silkk The Shocker – 3:58
 "Movin' On" (Fernando's Radio Edit)  – 3:52
 "Movin' On" (Album Version) – 4:30
 University Mix Featuring Noreaga, Raekwon – 4:30

Credits

Producer: Darryl "DAY" Pearson
Remix and additional production: A. Haqq Islam
Vocal arrangements: Sisqo
Recording studio: Silent Sound Studios

Recording engineer: Thom "TK" Kidd, Mike Alvord
Assistant recording engineer: Jason Webb, Kevin Lively
Mix studio: The Record Plant

Charts

Weekly charts

Year-end charts

Release history

References

External links
 MyaMya.com — official site

1998 singles
Mýa songs
Songs written by Mýa
Songs written by Darryl Pearson (musician)
1998 songs
Interscope Records singles
Songs about infidelity
Songs written by Sisqó